Township 9 is a township in Rooks County, Kansas, United States.

History
Rooks County was established with four townships: Bow Creek, Lowell, Paradise and Stockton. That number increased to seven by 1878 and twenty three in 1925. The twenty three townships were in place until 1971 when the number was reduced to the current twelve townships.

Township 9 was formed by renaming Fairview Township in 1971. While other Rooks County townships were combined pursuant to Kansas Statute 80-1110, Fairview was just renamed using the new naming standard.

Fairview Township
Fairview Township was established in 1925 from part of Walton Township. Walton Township was formed from Plainville Township. Plainville Township from Paradise Township.

References

Townships in Rooks County, Kansas
Townships in Kansas